Sowina may refer to:

Sowina, Greater Poland Voivodeship, a village in the administrative district of Gmina Pleszew, within Pleszew County, Greater Poland Voivodeship, in west-central Poland
Sowina Błotna, a village near Sowina in the administrative district of Gmina Pleszew, within Pleszew County, Greater Poland Voivodeship, in west-central Poland
Sowina, Jasło County, a village in the administrative district of Gmina Kołaczyce, within Jasło County, Subcarpathian Voivodeship, in south-eastern Poland